The Ministry of Internal Affairs of Altai Republic (Russian: Министерство внутренних дел по Республике Алтай) is the internal security ministry of the Altai Republic in southern Russia. The Ministry is headquartered in 25 Zhukovsky Street in Gorno-Altaysk city.

The current minister is Alexander Udovenko.

Structure
Information Center (Информационный центр)
Licenses and Permits (Группа лицензионно-разрешительной работы)
Investigations Directorate (Следственное управление)
Criminal Police (Криминальная полиция)
Administration (Штаб)
Public Security Police (полиция общественной безопасности)
Forensic Center (Экспертно-криминалистический центр)
Economic Security (Служба экономической безопасности)
Traffic Police	(ГИБДД)

External links
homepage
Traffic Police of the Altai Republic

Politics of the Altai Republic
Altai
Altai